Thibica is a locality, archaeological site and railroad station in Zaghouan Governorate, Tunisia, located near Dar Cheïkh Ali east of El Fahs.

History
 Thibica was a Roman Era civitas of the Roman province of  Africa Proconsolare. An ancient Christian bishopric was centered in the town.

References

Populated places in Tunisia
Catholic titular sees in Africa
Former Roman Catholic dioceses in Africa
Roman towns and cities in Africa (Roman province)